Malagasiini is a tribe of cicadas in the family Cicadidae, found in Africa and Madagascar. There are about 5 genera and at least 20 described species in Malagasiini.

Genera
These five genera belong to the tribe Malagasiini:
 Ligymolpa Karsch, 1890
 Malagasia Distant, 1882
 Malgachialna Boulard, 1980
 Nyara Villet, 1999
 Quintilia Stål, 1866

References

Further reading

External links

 

 
Tettigomyiinae
Hemiptera tribes